Oakridge is an historic home located near Blackstone, Nottoway County, Virginia. The main house is an early 19th-century frame structure consisting of a two-story, three-bay western section and a -story, one-bay east wing. It sits on a brick foundation and has a gable roof with modillion cornice.  The interior features a handsome stair in the Chinese Chippendale taste.

It was listed on the National Register of Historic Places in 1978.

References

External links
Oakridge website

Houses on the National Register of Historic Places in Virginia
Houses in Nottoway County, Virginia
National Register of Historic Places in Nottoway County, Virginia